USS Pargo (SS-264), a Gato-class submarine, was the first ship of the United States Navy to be named for the pargo, a fish of the genus Lutjanus found in the West Indies.

Construction and commissioning
Pargo was laid down on 21 May 1942 by the Electric Boat Company at Groton, Connecticut; launched 24 January 1943, sponsored by Miss Belle W. Baruch; and commissioned on 26 April 1943, Lieutenant Commander Ian C. Eddy in command.

First and second war patrols, August – December 1943 
Following shakedown and training Pargo sailed via the Panama Canal to Pearl Harbor, arriving 23 July 1943. The first of her eight war patrols began 18 August and took her into the East China Sea where she twice attacked the enemy, inflicting undetermined damage to several ships before returning to Pearl Harbor 6 October.

The efforts of the three were well directed against the open sea area northwest of the Marianas where Pargo sank two freighters, Manju Maru and Shoko Maru totaling 7,810 tons, on 29 and 30 November.

Third, fourth, and fifth war patrols, March – October 1944 

Pargo next underwent overhaul and received a new engine at Mare Island Naval Shipyard. On 5 March 1944 she was underway for Pearl Harbor and 25 March began her third war patrol. Her mission, to destroy enemy ships in the Philippine and Celebes Seas areas was carried out with several attacks, one of which sank an ex-net tender. Pargo began refitting at Fremantle, Australia 24 May.

Underway 13 June for the Celebes Sea, Pargo noted fewer ships present in the area. She scored well again, however, damaging several and sinking a 5,236 ton cargo ship, Yamagibu Maru.

Griffin (AS-13) refitted Pargo at Fremantle to prepare her for her next patrol. From 3 September to 7 October she ranged the South China Sea, pressing her attacks to damage several Japanese ships and to sink two more, including a minelayer.

24 August 1944 LCDR David B. Bell took command of the USS Pargo over from CDR Ian C. Eddy.

Sixth and seventh war patrols, October 1944 – March 1945 
From Exmouth Gulf she continued alone into the South China Sea where she found that increased allied air activity had further diminished use of the shipping lanes. She sank tanker Yuho Maru off Brunei Bay 26 November. Following this action she received from escorts the worst depth charging of her career, but escaped without serious damage, and returned to Australia 21 December.

Replenishment and retraining ensued, and on 15 January 1945 Pargo got underway for the Indo-China coast. Six days out she launched a night torpedo attack that damaged several ships. On 10 February she again engaged the enemy and ten days later blew up destroyer Nokaze. Pargo then sailed via Saipan and Pearl Harbor to Mare Island for a modernization overhaul which lasted from 25 March to 17 June.

Eighth war patrol, July – September 1945 
The submarine's eighth and final patrol spanned the 42-day interval from 14 July to 9 September. Transiting the minefields of Tsushima Straits, she entered the Sea of Japan where she attacked a six-ship convoy. She made her last sinking on 8 August, the passenger-cargo ship Rashin Maru, to total nine for the war. After Japanese capitulation, Pargo remained in the mine-filled waters until after the peace terms were signed and then sailed for Guam.

Returning to Pearl Harbor with the knowledge that she had contributed materially to the victory in the Pacific, Pargo assumed post-war duties as part of the squadron based there. She was decommissioned 12 June 1946 and was assigned to train Naval Reservists in the 13th Naval District where she remained until 1 June 1960 when her name was struck from the Navy List. Pargo was sold 17 April 1961.

Pargo received eight battle stars for World War II service. All eight of her war patrols were designated as "successful". She is credited with having sunk a total of 27,983 tons of enemy shipping.

See  for other ships of the same name.

References

Bibliography

External links 

navsource.org: USS Pargo

Gato-class submarines
World War II submarines of the United States
Ships built in Groton, Connecticut
1943 ships